Land of the Dead is another term for the afterlife or underworld.

Entertainment
 Land of the Dead, a 2005 zombie film directed by George A. Romero
 Land of the Dead: Road to Fiddler's Green, a 2005 first-person shooter video game based on the film
 The Land of the Dead, a 2000 audio drama based on the series of Doctor Who
 The Land of the Dead, a chapter in the 1940 film serial Flash Gordon Conquers the Universe
 "Land of the Dead" (Voltaire song), 2007
 "Land of the Dead" (Misfits song), 2009
 "Land of the Dead", a song on Summoning's 2005 album Oath Bound
 Land of the Dead (album), a 2011 album by heavy metal band Jack Starr's Burning Starr

Other
 Another term for the Egyptian underworld of Duat